Atenizus hylaeanus is a species of beetle in the family Cerambycidae. It was described by Martins in 1981.

References

Oemini
Beetles described in 1981